Ivan Ilić (born 17 March 2001) is a Serbian professional footballer who plays as a midfielder for Serie A club Torino, on loan from Hellas Verona, and the Serbia national team.

Club career

Red Star Belgrade
Ivan started playing football with local football club Filip Filipović. Ilić moved to Red Star Belgrade youth team from Real Niš in summer 2016. Shortly after he joined the new club, he signed his first three-year professional contract. Ilić made his senior debut for Red Star Belgrade in 28 fixture match of the 2016–17 Serbian SuperLiga season against Spartak Subotica, replacing Srđan Plavšić in last minute of the game played on 1 April 2017. He became the youngest debutant in the club history and first player born 2001 who appeared in the Serbian SuperLiga.

Manchester City move & Red Star loan
In summer 2017, Ilić had been sold to Manchester City along with his older brother Luka, staying on loan at Red Star until his 18th birthday.  At the beginning of October 2017, The Guardian picked Ilić as the most prospective first-year scholar in the academy of Manchester City. Ilić played his first full-time senior match in 5–0 Serbian Cup victory over Dinamo Vranje on 11 October 2017.

Hellas Verona & Torino 
In 2020, Ilić joined Serie A club Hellas Verona. He was loaned to Torino on 30 January 2023.

International career
Ilić made his first competitive matches with Serbia under-14 national team at the international tournament in Croatia in 2015. He noted 2 caps for the team, in matches against host country and the United States. In November 2015, Ilić was invited into the Serbia U15 squad, after which he represented the team until 2016. In early 2016, he was also with U16 national team. He has been called into the Serbia U17 squad since 2016. As a team member, he qualified for the 2017 UEFA European Under-17 Championship. Ilić also continued playing with under-17 level in 2017–18 UEFA qualifications, scoring his first goal for the team in 2–1 victory over Norway on 21 October 2017.

He made his debut for Serbia national football team on 7 June 2021 in a friendly against Jamaica.

In November 2022, he was selected in Serbia's squad for the 2022 FIFA World Cup in Qatar. He played in a group stage match against Brazil. Serbia finished fourth in the group.

Style of play
As a left-footed player, Ivan appeared as a left-back in early years of playing football. Later he converted his position on the field to defensive midfielder, and through the youth career, Ilić usually played pairing with his older brother Luka as a central midfielder. He is also available to play a classic defensive role in 4–1–4–1 formation, which he mostly played in national team. Like his brother, Ivan is 1.82 m tall.

Career statistics

Club

International

Personal life
Born in Niš, Ilić grew up in a sports family. His father Srđan played as a winger with Radnički Niš and his mother Danijela Ilić played basketball professionally. Ivan's older brother, Luka is also a professional footballer.

References

External links
 
 
 

2001 births
Living people
Sportspeople from Niš
Association football midfielders
Serbian footballers
Serbia youth international footballers
Red Star Belgrade footballers
FK Zemun players
Serbian SuperLiga players
Serbia under-21 international footballers
NAC Breda players
Eerste Divisie players
Serbian expatriate sportspeople in the Netherlands
Expatriate footballers in the Netherlands
Hellas Verona F.C. players
Torino F.C. players
Serie A players
Serbian expatriate footballers
Serbian expatriate sportspeople in Italy
Expatriate footballers in Italy
Serbia international footballers
2022 FIFA World Cup players